A Sinless Sinner is a 1919 British silent drama film directed by James C. McKay and starring Marie Doro, Godfrey Tearle and Sam Livesey. It was distributed in the United States the following year under the alternative title Midnight Gambols. It is now considered a lost film.

Cast
 Marie Doro as Irene Hendon
 Godfrey Tearle as Tom Harvey
 Sam Livesey as Sam Stevens
 Mary Jerrold as Mary Hendon
 Christine Maitland as Helen Legrande
 Gladys Ffolliott as Martha McBain
 Gordon Begg as Dr. Norton

References

Bibliography
 Low, Rachael. The History of the British Film 1918-1929. George Allen & Unwin, 1971.

External links
 

1919 films
British drama films
British silent feature films
Films directed by James C. McKay
1919 drama films
1910s English-language films
1910s British films
Silent drama films